Damhead railway station (also known as Damhead Halt) served the village of Maghaberry in County Down, Northern Ireland.

It was originally opened by the Great Northern Railway of Ireland in 1935, replacing an earlier request stop (known as "The Damhead") of the Ulster Railway.

Although it survived the rail network cuts instituted by the Ulster Transport Authority, it was not well used throughout its life, and closed in 1973, shortly after the formation of Northern Ireland Railways.

References

Disused railway stations in County Down
Railway stations opened in 1935
Railway stations closed in 1973
1935 establishments in Northern Ireland
1973 disestablishments in Northern Ireland
Railway stations in Northern Ireland opened in the 20th century